Marlowe is both a surname and a given name. Notable people with the name include:

Surname:
 Andrew W. Marlowe, American screenwriter
 Ann Marlowe, American critic, journalist and writer
 Anthony Marlowe (1904–1965), British politician
 Chris Marlowe (born 1951), American sportscaster
 Christopher Marlowe (1564–1593), English dramatist, poet and translator
 Deb Marlowe, American author
 Derek Marlowe (1938–1996), English writer
 Evan Marlowe, American film director, writer, and editor
 Fernanda Marlowe (born 1942), British actress
 Frank Marlowe (1904–1964), American character actor 
 Hugh Marlowe (1911–1982), American actor
 Julia Marlowe (1866–1950), actress
 June Marlowe (1903–1984), American actress
 Lara Marlowe, journalist
 Marion Marlowe (1929–2012), American singer and actress
 Mary Marlowe (1884–1962), Australian actress, writer and journalist
 Missy Marlowe (born 1971), American Olympic gymnast
 Paul Marlowe, Canadian author
 Scott Marlowe (1932–2001), American actor
 Stephen Marlowe (1928–2008), American author
 Sylvia Marlowe (1908–1981), American harpsichordist
 William Marlowe (1932–2004), British actor

Given name:
 Marlowe Morris (1915–1977 or 1978), American jazz musician
 Marlowe Peyton (born 2004), American singer and actor
 Marlowe Sturridge (born 2012), daughter of Sienna Miller and Tom Sturridge

Fictional characters:
 Marlowe Sawyer, in the television series Nip/Tuck
 Marlowe Viccellio, from the TV series Psych
 Jennifer Marlowe, character in WKRP in Cincinnati
 Natalie Marlowe, from the daytime soap opera All My Children
 Philip Marlowe, a fictional detective created by author Raymond Chandler
 Preston Marlowe, from the Battlefield Bad Company games

See also
 Marlow (disambiguation)
 Marlo

English unisex given names
English toponymic surnames